Morlan may refer to:

In people
A. R. Morlan (1958–2016), American author
Dorothy Morlan (1882–1967), American Impressionist artist
Eduardo Morlan (born 1986), Cuban minor league baseball pitcher 
Leire Morlans (born 1987), Spanish alpine skier
John Morlan (born 1947), American pitcher in Major League Baseball

Other
Morlan Township, Graham County, Kansas, township in the USA